The Germany women's national volleyball team is the national volleyball team of Germany. It is governed by the Deutscher Volleyball-Verband (DVV).

Team record

Olympic Games results

 Champions   Runners-up   Third place   Fourth place

World Championship
 Champions   Runners Up   Third Place   Fourth Place

World Grand Prix
 Champions   Runners Up   Third Place   Fourth Place

FIVB Nations League
 Champions   Runners-up   Third place   Fourth place

FIVB Volleyball World Cup
East Germany
 1989 — 5th Place

Germany
 1991 — 9th Place
 2011 — 6th Place

European Championship
 Champions   Runners Up   Third Place   Fourth Place

Team

Current squad
The following is the German roster in the 2018 World Championship.

Head coach: Felix Koslowski

Managers

Notes

References

External links
Official website
FIVB profile

Volleyball
National women's volleyball teams
Volleyball in Germany